The Long Beach Shoreline Marina is a marina based in Long Beach, California.

History
The marina was built in 1983 to host the competitions in Sailing at the 1984 Summer Olympics. The marina used the five gangways of this shoreline. The 1984 Summer Olympics were based in neighboring Los Angeles.

It is located near the Long Beach Convention and Entertainment Center, which hosted the competitions in Fencing at the 1984 Summer Olympics and Volleyball at the 1984 Summer Olympics.

Beneath the flagpole at Shoreline Park are the names of 74 Navy sailors who boarded the USS Frank E. Evans in Long Beach and perished in the Melbourne–Evans collision.

Gallery

References

1984 Summer Olympics official report. Volume 1. Part 1. pp. 156–60.

External links

Marinas in California
Buildings and structures in Long Beach, California
Sports venues in Long Beach, California
Venues of the 1984 Summer Olympics
Olympic sailing venues
Tourist attractions in Long Beach, California
1983 establishments in California